Sometimes She Cries is a song by American glam metal band Warrant. A power ballad, it was released in 1989 as the fourth single from Warrant's debut album Dirty Rotten Filthy Stinking Rich. The song charted at number 11 on the Mainstream Rock Tracks chart and number 20 on the Billboard Hot 100.

Background
"Sometimes She Cries" is the 2nd power ballad released from their debut album following the hit single Heaven; together, the two ballads sold the album to a wider, largely female audience. The song is a mix of gospel and classic rock. The music video is about a woman who has a child and her husband leaves her, Jani Lane sits on a wooden table and sings before being joined by the band behind him.

Tracklisting

Chart positions

References

Warrant (American band) songs
1989 songs
1990 singles
Songs written by Jani Lane
Columbia Records singles
Glam metal ballads